Broadfield also known as Lowest Pease Pottage is an electoral division of West Sussex in the United Kingdom, and returns one member to sit on West Sussex County Council.

Extent
The division covers the Broadfield neighbourhood area of the town of Crawley.

It falls entirely within the un-parished area of Crawley Borough and comprises the following borough wards: Broadfield North Ward and Broadfield South Ward.

Election results

2013 Election
Results of the election held on 2 May 2013:

2009 Election
Results of the election held on 4 June 2009:

2005 Election
Results of the election held on 5 May 2005:

References
Election Results - West Sussex County Council

External links
 West Sussex County Council
 Election Maps

Electoral Divisions of West Sussex